is a common masculine Japanese given name.

Possible writings
Hiroki can be written using different kanji characters and can mean: extensive, good fortune, spacious.

People with the name
Notable people with the name include:

, Japanese manga artist
, Japanese mixed martial artist
, Japanese footballer
, Japanese writer
, Japanese sport shooter
, Japanese judoka
, Japanese politician
, Japanese manga artist
, Japanese footballer
, Japanese boxer
, Japanese badminton player
, Japanese boxer
, Japanese golfer
, Japanese footballer
, Japanese video game designer
Hiroyuki Hamada (martial artist) (1925–2003), Japanese karateka
, Japanese sprinter
, Japanese footballer
, Japanese musician
, Japanese boxer
, Japanese politician
, Japanese dancer and record producer
, Japanese actor
, Japanese cross-country skier
, Japanese animator and anime director
, Japanese footballer
, Japanese powerlifter
, Japanese footballer
, Japanese video game director, designer and producer
, Japanese conductor and percussionist
, Japanese video game composer
, Japanese sprint canoeist
, yakuza member
, Japanese manga artist
, Japanese sumo wrestler
, Japanese academic and politician
, Japanese rugby union player
, Japanese anime director
, Japanese baseball player
, Japanese modern pentathlete
, Japanese video game designer
, Japanese actor and voice actor
, Japanese animator, anime director and screenwriter
, Japanese animator, manga artist and illustrator
, Japanese footballer and manager
, Japanese baseball player
, Japanese footballer
, Japanese video game and anime producer
, Japanese footballer
, Japanese gymnast
, Japanese footballer
, Japanese ice hockey player
, Japanese shogi player
, Japanese ice hockey player
, Japanese actor and comedian
, Japanese writer
, Japanese animator and anime director
, Japanese politician
, Japanese slalom canoeist
, Japanese actor
, Japanese baseball player
, Japanese sport shooter
, Japanese film director
Hiroyuki Nakano (athlete) (born 1988), Japanese sprinter
, Japanese musician
, Japanese film director
, Japanese footballer
, Japanese manga artist
, founder of 2channel, owner of 4chan
, Japanese triathlete
, Japanese animator and anime director
, Japanese footballer
, Japanese footballer
, Japanese actor
, Japanese video game writer
, Japanese baseball player
Hiroyuki Saeki, Japanese badminton player
, Japanese sumo wrestler
, Japanese baseball player
, Japanese chef
, Japanese footballer
, Japanese actor
, Japanese pole vaulter
, Japanese geneticist
, Japanese footballer
, Japanese composer and musician
, Japanese long jumper
, Japanese footballer
, Japanese politician
, Japanese footballer
, Japanese architectural historian
, Japanese figure skater and coach
, Japanese yo-yo performer
, Japanese-born actor 
, Japanese footballer
, Japanese video game producer and writer
, Japanese footballer
, Japanese mixed martial artist
, Japanese footballer
, Japanese manga artist
, Japanese printmaker
, Japanese manga artist
, Japanese politician
, Japanese footballer
, Japanese rugby union player
, Japanese footballer
, Japanese sushi chef
, Japanese sumo wrestler
Hiroyuki Togashi (born 1955), Japanese politician
, Japanese basketball player
, Japanese gymnast
, Japanese footballer and manager
, Japanese manga artist and anime director
, Japanese architect
, Japanese actor
, Japanese comedian
, Japanese anime director
, Japanese wheelchair racer
, Japanese footballer
, Japanese composer
Hiroyuki Yokoo, Japanese voice actor
, Japanese footballer
, Japanese politician
, Japanese voice actor
, Japanese screenwriter

Fictional characters
Hiroyuki Kurusu, a midfielder footballer character in the Days (manga) 
Hiroyuki, Fūsuke's pet penguin in the Ninku manga series

References

Japanese masculine given names